Aileen Quimado Iwamoto (born August 29, 1988), known by her stage name , is a Japanese–Filipino actress, model and reality television personality. She is the first runner up in the third season of StarStruck, a reality-based talent search show of GMA Network. She is well known for playing Rita Acuesta on Kung Mahawi Man Ang Ulap and Valentina in Darna.

Acting
Iwa Moto auditioned for  StarStruck but failed to qualify until she has succeeded in audition for the third season in which she ended up as the First Princess along with Gian Carlos as the First Prince. After StarStruck, Iwamoto appeared on SOP Gigsters, Love to Love: Young At Heart and Nuts Entertainment. During her stint in Nuts Entertainment, Iwamoto was suspended for 6 weeks along with Jackie Rice. After the suspension, Iwamoto came back to Nuts Entertainment, joined the cast of Bakekang, her first primetime show where she played Jenny, the best friend of Kristal, played by Lovi Poe, and also on the last season of Love to Love which is Jazz Got Lucky. Iwamoto also portrayed her life story on Magpakailanman. In 2007, Iwamoto appeared in Super Twins, wherein she portrayed the character Moshi Moshi Manika, her first antagonist role. After that, Iwamoto portrayed Rita on Sine Novela'''s third installment Kung Mahawi Man Ang Ulap, wherein she got a favorable response from the viewers of the show.

Due to her performance in Kung Mahawi Man ang Ulap, she was in included in Zaido: Pulis Pangkalawakan as a Black Amazona, her third antagonist role. In 2008, Iwamoto became the image model of FHM Philippines, making her the third Filipina to hold that title after Asia Agcaoili and Katrina Halili. In September of the same year, Iwamoto appeared on the cover of FHM Philippines for the second time. She was a previous covergirl of FHM Singapore. Straight after Zaido: Pulis Pangkalawakan, Iwamoto was given a supporting role in Robin Padilla's Joaquin Bordado, as Diane, but her character was killed off for Iwamoto to focus on Sine Novela's eighth installment Magdusa Ka with Katrina Halili and Dennis Trillo. After that, Iwamoto was included on the cast of Luna Mystika as Donita Sagrado, the main antagonist of Heart Evangelista's character.

In 2009, Iwa Moto appeared in the primetime series Adik Sa'Yo as Andrea, but left for Darna to play Valentina, the main antagonist of Darna and her biggest role in a drama so far. In 2010, Iwamoto began reappearing currently reappearing in Darna and also on Sine Novela: Ina, Kasusuklaman Ba Kita?, in which she portrays the role of Rossan. In Darna, she played the character Valentina, the prime rival of superheroine Darna. She appeared in Love Bug: "Last Romance" and also as a guest in Pilyang Kerubin and in the TV series Beauty Queen. In 2011, she participated in Dwarfina, starring Heart Evangelista and Dennis Trillo. Her last TV project was Andres de Saya, starring Cesar Montano and Iza Calzado. In 2012, she appeared on Wil Time Bigtime'' but left shortly due to her existing contract with GMA Network.

Personal life
Iwa Moto is the eldest of the three siblings. Her father, the late  was a Japanese immigrant to the Philippines while her mother is Filipino.

Since 2012, Iwa Moto is in a relationship with Panfilo "Pampi" Lacson Jr., son of Senator Panfilo Lacson, with whom she has a daughter born in September 2013. She gave birth to a son in 2021.

Filmography

Television

Film

Awards

References

External links

Iwa Moto on FHM.com.ph
Iwa Moto on iGMA.tv

1988 births
Living people
Actresses of Japanese descent
Filipino child actresses
Filipino film actresses
Filipino female models
Filipino people of Japanese descent
Filipino television actresses
People from Las Piñas
Participants in Philippine reality television series
StarStruck (Philippine TV series) participants
GMA Network personalities
TV5 (Philippine TV network) personalities
Tagalog people